Claudio Rinaldi may refer to:

Claudio Rinaldi (painter) (1852–?), Italian painter
Claudio Rinaldi (poker player)
Claudio Rinaldi (speed skater) (born 1987), Italian short-track speed-skater